Roquefort-la-Bédoule is a commune in the Bouches-du-Rhône department in the Provence-Alpes-Côte d'Azur region in Southern France. Its inhabitants are called Bédoulens (masculine) and Bédoulennes (feminine). In 2018, Roquefort-la-Bédoule had a population of 5,896.

Geography
Roquefort-la-Bédoule is situated north of Cassis, Ceyreste and La Cadière-d'Azur, Var; south of Aubagne, Gémenos and Cuges-les-Pins; east of Carnoux-en-Provence; and west of Le Castellet, Var.

History
The town of Roquefort-la-Bédoule was founded in the 7th century. In 1966, the new commune of Carnoux-en-Provence was established on former Roquefort-la-Bédoule territory.

Demographics

See also
Communes of the Bouches-du-Rhône department

References

Communes of Bouches-du-Rhône
Bouches-du-Rhône communes articles needing translation from French Wikipedia